Basketballvereniging Rotterdam-Zuid (in English: Rotterdam South Basketball Club), commonly known as RZ is a basketball club from Rotterdam.

History 
RZ was founded in 1956 and has for many years with a great commitment of board members, executives and also ordinary members and players, that can no longer think sports in sport country. RZ fought until the early nineties in the highest national league and even European Cup matches played at European level in Ahoy, as against Maccabi Elite Tel Aviv or Real Madrid. During the heyday played men like John Loorbach, Marcel Welch, Jan Dekker and the "Famous Mister" Jackie Dinkins who was a phenomenon far beyond the border. For years was the home of South Rotterdam, the sports hall Enk, sphere of activity.

After a glorious history in the former decades, also escaped RZ not a drop of the low point in 1996, a fire in the clubhouse and only a membership of 60 members.

Honours

Men's team
Eredivisie
 Winners (1): 1973-74
Dutch Cup
 Runners-up (2): 1972-73, 1974–75

Women's team
Dames Eredivisie
 Winners (2): 1976–77, 1977–78

European record

Notable players 

  John Loorbach
  Marcel Welch
  Jan Dekker
  Jacky Dinkins

References 

Former Dutch Basketball League teams
Basketball teams in the Netherlands
Basketball teams established in 1956
Sports clubs in Rotterdam